Robert Lücking (born 1964) is a German lichenologist. He is a leading expert on foliicolous lichens–lichens that live on leaves.

Life and career
Born in Ulm in 1964, Lücking earned both his master's (1990) and PhD degree (1994) at the University of Ulm. Both degrees concerned the taxonomy, ecology, and biodiversity of foliicolous lichens. His graduate supervisor was mycologist and bryologist Sieghard Winkler, who had previously studied epiphyllous (upper leaf-dwelling) fungi in El Salvador and Colombia. In 1996 Lücking was awarded the Mason E. Hale award for an "outstanding doctoral thesis presented by a candidate on a lichenological theme". His thesis was titled Foliikole Flechten und ihre Mikrohabitatpraferenzen in einem tropischen Regenwald in Costa Rica ("Foliicolous lichens and their microhabitat preferences in a tropical rainforest in Costa Rica"). In this work, Lücking recorded 177 foliicolous lichen species from the shrub layer in a Costa Rican tropical forest. After a short-term assignment as a visiting professor in Recife, Brazil, he undertook a two-year post-doctoral stint in Ulm to further study foliicolous lichens. Lücking earned his habilitation from his studies (1998–2001) at the University of Bayreuth, under the supervision of Gerhard Rambold. In 2001, he was hired as adjunct curator at Chicago's Field Museum of Natural History, and was later promoted to research collections manager for mycology. Lücking and co-authors have twice been bestowed with the Tuckerman Award from the American Bryological and Lichenological Society; this award is given to the most outstanding lichenological paper published each year in the scientific journal The Bryologist. The first (awarded in 2008) was for their publication about the Gomphillaceae in eastern North America, while the second (awarded in 2017) was the highly cited "2016 classification of lichenized fungi in the Ascomycota and Basidiomycota". Since 2015, Lücking has been the curator of lichens, fungi, and bryophytes at the Berlin Botanical Garden and Botanical Museum. Other research interests of his include fungal evolution, systematics, and nomenclature.

Eponymy
Several lichen species have been named to honour Lücking. These include: Aspidothelium lueckingii ; Byssoloma lueckingii ; Calenia lueckingii ; Chapsa lueckingii ; Coenogonium lueckingii ; Dictyomeridium lueckingii ; Enterographa lueckingii ; Graphis lueckingii ; Hypotrachyna lueckingii ; Kalbographa lueckingii ; Mazosia lueckingii ; Palicella lueckingii ; Pertusaria lueckingii ; Phlyctis lueckingii ; Platygramme lueckingii ; and Thelotrema lueckingii . The genus Lueckingia  is also named after him.

Selected publications
Lücking is a highly published scientist, and has formally described hundreds of fungal and lichen species new to science. A few of his major or highly cited works include:

See also
 :Category:Taxa named by Robert Lücking

References

Living people
1964 births
German lichenologists
German taxonomists
20th-century German scientists
21st-century German scientists
University of Ulm alumni